The Andalusia autonomous basketball team is the basketball team of Andalusia, Spain. The team is not affiliated to FIBA, so only plays friendly games.

History
The Andalusian team only played two friendly games, a first one against a USA All-Star team in 1985 and a second one against Croatia in 1993. For this second game, due to the lack of professional players in the region, the two coaches Mario Pesquera and Javier Imbroda had called up three foreign players.

Games played

References

External links
Andalusian Basketball Federation website

Sport in Andalusia
Andalusia